was a Japanese actor and film director. He was also known by the name Satoshi Yamamura, while his actual birth name is Koga Hirosada. Yamamura graduated from University of Tokyo. In 1942, Yamamura and Isao Yamagata formed the Bunkaza Theatre Company.

He began his career as a screen actor in 1946 and appeared in more than 110 films between 1947 and 1991. In 1953, he debuted as a director  with his film Kanikōsen and directed other three films. Yamamura was introduced to Western audiences in the 1958 film The Barbarian and the Geisha. In the US, he is well known for his portrayals of Japanese Admiral Isoroku Yamamoto of the Combined Fleet, in Tora! Tora! Tora!, and of Mr. Sakamoto, the CEO of Assan Motors in Gung Ho.

Yamamura appeared in a lot of jidaigeki television dramas. He played the role of Tokugawa Ieyasu in the taiga drama Haru no Sakamichi in 1971. His major historical roles were Yagyū Munenori in the 1978 The Yagyu Conspiracy and Hoshina Masayuki in the 1980 Shadow Warriors. In addition to historical parts, he appeared in fictional series. He portrayed as Otowaya Hanemon in the Hissatsu series Hissatsu Shikakenin, he reprised the character in the film series later.

Selected filmography

Films

 Inochi Arukagiri (1946)
 Chikagai nijuyojikan (1947)
 The Love of the Actress Sumako (1947) - Hōgetsu Shimamura
 Daini no jinsei (1948)
 Taifuken no onna (1948)
 Onna no tatakai (1949) 
 Kirare no Senta (1949)
 Ryusei (1949)
 Shojo takara (1950) - Yoshitaro Hanawa
 Yoshitaro Hanawa (1950) - Ryosuke Izumi
 The Munekata Sisters (1950) - Ryosuke Mimura, Setsuko's husband
 Portrait of Madame Yuki (1950) - Tateoka
 Kikyō (1950) - Ongi
 Senka o koete (1950)
 Hirate Miki (1951)
 Eriko to tomoni - Dai ichi-bu (1951) - Sōtarō
 Eriko to tomo ni: Dai ni-bu (1951) - Sōtarō
 Jiyū gakkō (1951) - Taku Henmi
 Dare ga watashi o sabaku no ka (1951)
 Sekirei no kyoku (1951)
 Maihime (1951) - Motoo Yagi
 The Lady of Musashino (1951) -  Eiji Ono
 Hibari no komoriuta (1951)
 Repast (1951)
 Seishun kaigi (1952) - Haruki Eda
 Okuni to Gohei (1952) - Tomonojo
 Kin no tamago: Golden girl (1952)
 Kon'na watashi ja nakatta ni (1952) - Takeshi Yajima
 Gendai-jin (1952)
 Choito neesan omoide yanagi (1952) - Koshimura
 Ashi ni sawatta onna (1952) - Yasukichi Sakaza
 Oka wa hanazakari (1952) - Ryōzō Noro
 Ringo-en no shōjo (1952)
 My Wonderful Yellow Car (1953) - The husband
 Mura hatibu (1953)
 Epitome (1953) - Wakabayashi
 Kanikōsen (1953) – Matsuki (also dir.)
 Tokyo Story (1953) - Koichi Hirayama
 An Inlet of Muddy Water (1953) – Asanosuke (episode 3 "Troubled Waters")
 Nihon yaburezu (1954)
 Sound of the Mountain (1954) - Ogata Shingo
 Dobu (1954) – Businessman
 Moeru Shanghai (1954) - Shōfū Muramatsu
 Kakute yume ari (1954) - Takashi Shōkōchi
 Karatachi no hana (1954) - Chotaro Kitahara
 Otsukisama ni wa warui kedo (1954) - Yā-san
 Kuroi ushio (1954) (also dir.)
 Aisureba koso (1955) - Gorō (segment 3)
 Ai no onimotsu (1955)
 Yuki no koi (1955)
 Seishun kaidan (1955) - Tetsuya, father of Chiharu
 Princess Yang Kwei-Fei (1955) - An Lushan
 Till We Meet Again (1955) - Daisuke Kaji
 Sara no hana no toge (1955) - Gunnoshin Sakakibara
 Early Spring (1956) - Yutaka Kawai
 Mahiru no ankoku (1956) - Yuji
 Tsukigata Hanpeita: Hana no maki; Arashi no maki (1956) - Kogoro Katsura
 Yonjū-hassai no teikō (1956) - Kotaro Nishimura
 Typhoon Over Nagasaki (1957) - Hori
 Tokyo Twilight (1957) - Seki Sekiguchi
 Jigoku bana (1957) - Umasuke
 Chieko-sho (1957) - Kotaro Takamura
 Yoru no chō (1957) - Ichiro Shirosawa
 Hatsukoi monogatari (1957) - Shōhei Ganmaru
 The Hole (1957) - Keikichi Shirasu
 Bakuon to daichi (1957)
 Doshaburi (1957) - Okubo, Father of Tanes children
 Do no hājiki wa jigokū dazē (1958)
 Anzukko (1958) - Heishiro Hirayama - the father
 Hibari no hanagata tantei kassen (1958)
 The Barbarian and the Geisha  (1958) - Governor Tamura
 Muhō gai no yarō domo (1959)
 Jigokū no sokō made tsuki auzē (1959)
 Ningen no jōken (1959) - Okishima
 Chūshingura: ōka no maki, kikka no maki (1959)
 Hahakogusa (1959) - Mr Fujiki
 Shingo jūban shōbu: dai-ni-bu (1959)
 Yami o yokogire (1959) - Takazawa
 Tatsumaki bugyō (1959)
 Jan Arima no shūgeki (1959) - Saburobei Obata
 Shōri to haiboku (1960) - Kimpei Minegishi
 Zoku beran me-e geisha (1960)
 Arega minato no hi da (1961)
 Hatamoto kenka taka (1961) - Suruganokami Koyama
 Gonin no totsugeki tai (1961) - Gen. Mayor Soje
 Fundoshi isha (1961) - Dr. Meikai Ikeda
 Waga koi no tabiji (1961)
 The Littlest Warrior (1961) - Fujiwara No Morozane (voice)
 Onna wa nido umareru (1961) - Kiyomasa Tsutsui
 Haitoku no mesu (1961) - Naoyuki Nishizawa
 Netsuai sha (1961) - Murai
 The Last War (1961) - Prime Minister
 Boku wa jigoku no tehinshi da (1961)
 Katei no jijō (1962) - Heitaro Misawa
 The Inheritance (1962) - Senzō
 Musume to watashi (1962) - Shiro Iwatani
 Taiheiyō Sensō to Himeyuri Butai (1962)
 Akitsu Springs (1962) - Mikami
 Star of Hong Kong (1962) - Gentarō Sugimoto
 Namida o shishi no tategami ni (1962) - Kōhei Matsudaira
 Fūten Rōjin nikki (1962) - Tokusuke Rōjin
 Born in Sin (1962) - Shinzō Tagaya
 Yama no sanka: moyuru wakamono tachi (1962)
 Zoku shinobi no mono (1963)
 Gyangu Chūshingura (1963)
 Kizudarake no sanga (1964) - Kappei Arima
 Ane to imōto (1965) - Yoshirō Takaoka
 Nikutai no gakko (1965) - Toshinobu Hira
 With Beauty and Sorrow (1965) - Toshio Ōki
 Taiheiyō kiseki no sakusen: Kisuka (1965) - Kawashima
 Japan's Longest Day (1967) - Mitsumasa Yonai
 The Militarists (1970) - Mitsumasa Yonai
 Tora! Tora! Tora! (1970) - Admiral Isoroku Yamamoto
 Lone Wolf and Cub: Baby Cart in Peril (1972) - Gōmune Jindaiyu
 Hissatsu Shikakenin (1973) - Han'emon Otowaya
Hissatsu Shikakenin Baian Arijigoku (1973) - Hanemon Otowaya
Hissatsu Shikakenin Shunsetsu shikakebari (1974) - Hanemon Otowaya
 Prophecies of Nostradamus (1974) - Prime Minister Kuroki
 Dōmyaku rettō (1975) - Nagata
 Shag (1978) - Head of Maritime Safety Agency
 Kage no Gundan: Hattori Hanzo (1979)
 Nankyoku Monogatari (1983) - Iwakiri Sencho
 Nidaime wa Christian (1985) - Nakatsugawa
 Gung Ho (1986) - Mr. Sakamoto
 Yoshiwara enjō (1987) - Isaburo Okura
 Code Name Black Cat o oe (1987) - Superintendent Supervisor Amano
 Godzilla vs. King Ghidorah (1991) - Prime Minister
 Going West: To the West (1997)

Television
 Haru no Sakamichi (1971) - Tokugawa Ieyasu
 Hissatsu Shikakenin (1972)  - Otowaya Hanemon
 The Water Margin (1973) - Lu Junyi
 Tasukenin Hashiru (1973–1974) - Seibei
 Karei-naru Ichizoku (1974–75) - Daisuke Manpyo
 The Yagyu Conspiracy (1978) - Yagyū Munenori
 Akō Rōshi (1979) - Chisaka Hyōbu
 Hattori Hanzō:Kage no Gundan (1980) - Hoshina Masayuki
 Yagyu Abaretabi (1980–81) - Yagyū Munenori
 Yagyu Jyubei Abaretabi (1982–83) - Yagyū Munenori
 Ōoku (1983) - Arai Hakuseki
 Seibu Keisatsu partIII Daimon sisu Otokotachiyo Eienni (1984) (Final episode)- Saeki
 Tsūkai! Kōchiyama Sōshun (1975–1976) - Mizuno Tadakuni

Honours
Medal with Purple Ribbon (1977)
Order of the Rising Sun, 4th Class, Gold Rays with Rosette (1983)

References

External links

1910 births
2000 deaths
Japanese male film actors
People from Nara Prefecture
Japanese film directors
20th-century Japanese male actors
Actors from Nara Prefecture
Recipients of the Medal with Purple Ribbon
Recipients of the Order of the Rising Sun, 4th class